Totegan is a hamlet in Sutherland, Scotland and is one of the most northerly settlements in mainland Scotland. The nearest main road to the hamlet is the A386. The hamlet only has a few cottages.

See also
Extreme points of the United Kingdom

Populated places in Sutherland